Skaldowie (namesake: The Skalds) is an art rock band which formed in Kraków, Poland in 1965. With their musical training and proximity to the folklore-rich area of Podhale, many of their tracks incorporate themes of rock, folk, and classical music. The band became particularly popular in 1972 with their debut album, Krywań, Krywań.

Skaldowie received numerous national awards between 1966 and 1980, and were one of the most popular musical groups in Poland at the time.

Discography

Studio Albums 
 Skaldowie (1967)
 Wszystko Mi Mówi, Że Mnie Ktoś Pokochał (1968)
 Cała Jesteś W Skowronkach (1969)
 Od Wschodu Do Zachodu Słońca (1970)
 Ty (1971)
 Krywań, Krywań (1973)
 Wszystkim Zakochanym (1973)
 Stworzenia Świata Część Druga (1977)
 Szanujmy Wspomnienia (1977)
 Rezerwat Miłości (1979)
 Droga Ludzi (1980)
 Nie Domykajmy Drzwi (1989)
 Harmonia Świata (2006)
 Oddychać I Kochać (2009)
 Pieśń Nad Pieśniami, Czyli Ballada O Człowieka O Miłości (2011)

Live Albums 
 Cisza Krzyczy - Leningrad 1972 (An Official Live Bootleg) (2007)
 Z Archiwum Polskiego Radia, Vol.16-17. Nagrania Koncertowe Z Lat 1966–1990 (2008)
 Live In Germany 1974 (2012)
 Live In Germany 1972 (2013)

References

External links 
 Full discography

Musical groups established in 1965
Polish rock music groups